"Local Rappers" is a song by Nigerian rap artist Reminisce featuring vocals from Olamide and Phyno. The song was released off his Baba Hafusa album through EDGE Records on 21 January 2015.

Critical reception and controversy
The release of "Local Rappers" was met with different opinions among music critics with some commending the artists for rapping in their local dialects while some perceived the song to be a diss track against rappers in Nigeria who rapped in English language. It was reported in the media that Mode 9 was unimpressed with Reminisce over some lines in the lyrics of the song. Mode 9 went on to deny such reports as "untrue".

Release history

Audio release

Video release

Accolades and nominations

References

2015 songs
Olamide songs
Nigerian songs
Gangsta rap songs